Alexander Oleinik may refer to:

 Aleksandr Oleinik (born 1982), Russian footballer
 Alexander Oleinik (kickboxer) (born 1986), Ukrainian kickboxer and Muay Thai fighter